= The Quietest Year =

2023 documentary film

The Quietest Year is a 2023 documentary film which explores the impact of noise pollution on public health and the environment.
